Pleomorphomonas is a genus of bacteria from the order Hyphomicrobiales.

Phylogeny
The currently accepted taxonomy is based on the List of Prokaryotic names with Standing in Nomenclature (LPSN). The phylogeny is based on whole-genome analysis.

References

Hyphomicrobiales
Bacteria genera